Neil Berry (born 6 April 1963) is a Scottish former footballer, who played the majority of his career with Heart of Midlothian.

He was known for his tough-tackling, no nonsense style of play. He was a regular in the Hearts team throughout much of the 1980s and early 1990s, and was a member of the 1985–86 team that lost the league title on the last game of the season to Celtic, and the 1986 Scottish Cup Final to Aberdeen.

Although he was chiefly a midfielder, he could also play in defence and was often drafted into the rearguard alongside the likes of Craig Levein.

References

External links
London Hearts - Neil Berry Profile

1963 births
Living people
Footballers from Edinburgh
Scottish footballers
Scottish Football League players
English Football League players
Association football midfielders
Bolton Wanderers F.C. players
Heart of Midlothian F.C. players
Falkirk F.C. players
Hamilton Academical F.C. players
Cowdenbeath F.C. players
Scotland youth international footballers